Group A was a set of motor racing regulations for touring and rally cars.

Group A may also refer to:
 Group A Sports Cars, a set of Australian motor racing regulations utilised for prototype Sports Racing Cars
 Group A, one group of the List of U.S. Army weapons by supply catalog designation
 Group A, an anti-authoritarian political group in Helsiniki, Finland
 The original name of Alpha Group
 Group A streptococcal infection, a medical condition
 One of six or eight groups of four teams competing at the FIFA World Cup
 2022 FIFA World Cup Group A
 2018 FIFA World Cup Group A
 2014 FIFA World Cup Group A
 2010 FIFA World Cup Group A
 2006 FIFA World Cup Group A
 2002 FIFA World Cup Group A
 1998 FIFA World Cup Group A
 1994 FIFA World Cup Group A
 1990 FIFA World Cup Group A

See also 
 Group B (disambiguation)